Green View Tower is a skyscraper in Tijuana, Mexico and has become a prominent fixture in the city. It is located within the central business district of Tijuana, the Zona Rio.

It is composed of only 58 upscale condos. It features its own mall, plus a penthouse. It was designed by Julio Gaeta and Luby Springall of Gaeta Springall Arquitectos.

See also
List of tallest buildings in Tijuana

References

http://gaeta-springall.com/

Green View Tower on Emporis

External links
 Green View Tower

Skyscrapers in Tijuana
Skyscraper office buildings in Mexico
Residential skyscrapers in Mexico
Office buildings completed in 2009
2009 establishments in Mexico
Residential buildings completed in 2009